Angel of Death may refer to:

Arts, entertainment and media

Aviation 
"Angel of Death", AC130 gunship's nickname

Fictional characters
 Adam or Andrew, in Touched by an Angel
 Azrael, in Lucifer
 Loki, in the film Dogma
 Jaffar, in the Game Boy Advanced game Fire Emblem: The Blazing Blade

Gaming
 Broken Sword: The Angel of Death, a 2007 computer game
 Angels of Death (video game), a Japanese horror computer game, 2015

Literature
 Angel of Death (novel), by Jack Higgins, 1995
 Angel of Death, a novel by Alane Ferguson

Music 
 "Angel of Death" (Hank Williams song)
 "Angel of Death" (Slayer song), 1986
 "Angel of Death" (Thin Lizzy song), 1982
 "Angel of Death", a song by Angel Witch on Angel Witch (album), 1980
 "Angel of Death", a song by Helstar on the album Remnants of War, 1986
 Angel of Death, a symphonic poem by George Whitefield Chadwick, 1918
 "Angel of Death", a song by Manchester Orchestra on The Million Masks of God, 2021

Television
 "Angel of Death" (NCIS), a 2007 TV episode
 "The Angel of Death", a 2007 episode of Robin Hood
 "The Angel of Death", a season 6 episode of Dexter, 2011
 Angel of Death (web series), 2009
 Angel of Death, a 2005 BBC dramatization of the life of Beverley Allitt

People
 Angel of Death (wrestler) (David Sheldon, 1953–2007), American wrestler
 Beverley Allitt (born 1968), English nurse and murdererd four children in 1991
 Richard Angelo (born 1962), New York nurse who poisoned 35 patients, killing 10
 Kristen Gilbert (born 1967), American nurse who murdered four patients in Massachusetts, U.S.
 Donald Harvey (1952-2017), American orderly and convicted serial killer who claims to have murdered 87 people
 Genene Jones (born July 13, 1950), responsible for the deaths of up to 60 infants and children
 Josef Mengele (1911–1979), German SS officer and Nazi concentration camp doctor
 August Miete (1908-1987), German SS officer and Nazi extermination camp officer
 Colin Norris (born 1976), Scottish nurse and serial killer
 Robledo Puch (born 1952), Argentine serial killer
 Louis Antoine de Saint-Just (1767–1794), French revolutionary organizer of the Reign of Terror
 Harold Shipman (1946–2004), English doctor who murdered up to 250 elderly patients
 Orville Lynn Majors (1961-2017), American nurse who murdered at least 6, possibly 130, elderly patients

Religion
 Azrael, or Malak al-Maut, in Islam
 Dumah (angel), in Rabbinical and Islamic literature
 Michael (archangel), in Catholicism
 Mot (god), an angel of death from the Hebraic Book of Habakkuk
 Nasirdîn and Sejadin, in Yazidism
 Samael, in Talmudic and post-Talmudic lore
 Saureil, in Mandaeism

Other uses 
 Angel of death (criminology), a type of serial killer
 Amanita ocreata or angel of death, a species of poisonous mushroom

See also 

 Angels of Death (disambiguation)
 Death (personification)
 Death angel (disambiguation)
 Destroying angel (disambiguation)
 Exterminating Angel (disambiguation)
 Alfredo Astiz (born 1951), Argentine Navy officer known as the "Blond Angel of Death"
 Death and the Sculptor, also known as Angel of Death and the Sculptor, a sculpture by Daniel Chester French
 Santa Muerte, a sacred figure venerated primarily in Mexico
 Shinigami, god or spirit of death in Japanese mythology
 Thanatos, the personification of death in Greek mythology
 Yama, lord of death, in early Rigvedic Hinduism

Nicknames in crime